Elemér Gorondy-Novák (Novák; 23 February 1885 – 14 May 1954) was a Hungarian military officer, who served as commander of the Hungarian Third Army during the Second World War.

Career
After the First World War he served as chief of staff of the First Division in the Hungarian Red Army. Later he joined to Miklós Horthy's counter-revolutionary National Army. He was promoted to general on 1 November 1934. Between 1 February 1935 and 1 October 1937 he served as commander of the 2nd Cavalry Brigade. On 1 May 1938 he became lieutenant general and an observer of the acceleration forces, and since 31 December 1938, of the cavalry.

He was appointed commander of the Third Army on 1 March 1940. He commanded the army during the occupation of Vojvodina. He was promoted to cavalry general on 1 May 1941. He was deposed from the army commander position on 1 November 1941. He was retired on 1 February 1942. From 22 October 1942 he served as royal councillor. After the Second World War, Gorondy-Novák moved abroad. He died in Argentina.

Trivia
Gorondy-Novák was called Goromba-Novák ("Rude-Novák") by his soldiers because of his strictness and rough style.

References
 Magyar Életrajzi Lexikon
 II. világháború - tények, képek, adatok

1885 births
1954 deaths
Hungarian soldiers
Hungarian military personnel of World War II